Joseph Docteur House is a historic home and farm complex located at Cape Vincent in Jefferson County, New York.  The limestone farmhouse was built about 1847 and has two sections: a -storey main block and a 1-storey wooden rear wing.  Also on the property are a 19th-century barn and three sheds.

It was listed on the National Register of Historic Places in 1985.

References

Houses on the National Register of Historic Places in New York (state)
Houses in Jefferson County, New York
National Register of Historic Places in Jefferson County, New York